Carmen Du Sautoy (born 26 February 1950) is a British stage, television and film actor.

Early life
Du Sautoy was born in London. She has played a wide variety of leading roles with the Royal Shakespeare Company, Royal National Theatre, in London's West End, and in New York, Tokyo, Sydney, Madrid, Berlin and in many other major theatres worldwide.

Career
Du Sautoy may be best known to film audiences for her role as the belly-dancing Lebanese temptress Saida in the 1974 James Bond film The Man with the Golden Gun. She has had an extensive television career with numerous starring roles in amongst others Lost Empires, Poor Little Rich Girl, La Ronde, The Citadel, The Orchid House, A Dance to the Music of Time, Chessgame, Midsomer Murders, Hammer House of Horror, Absolutely Fabulous, and The South Bank Show.

Personal life
Du Sautoy married theatre director and writer Charles Savage in 1974.

Films
The Man with the Golden Gun (1974) – Saida
It Couldn't Happen Here (1987)
Poor Little Rich Girl: The Barbara Hutton Story (1987) – Roussie
Bert Rigby, You're a Fool (1989) – Tess Trample
Paparazzo (1995) – Marjorie
Dream (2001) – Compere at audition
Method (2004) – Mother (Mona)
Royally Ever After  (2018) - Queen Patricia
Telling Lies

Television
The Brothers (1976) – Ika
Astronauts (TV series) (1981–1983) – Dr. Gentian Foster
The Barretts of Wimpole Street (1982) – Arabel Barrett 
 Praying Mantis (1983)- Vera Canova
The Citadel (1983) – Frances Lawrence
Chessgame (1983) – Faith Steerforth
Strangers and Brothers (1984) – Ann Simon / Ann March
Hammer House of Mystery and Suspense (1984) – Suzy Kendrick
Lost Empires (1986) – Julie Blane
Bergerac (1988) – Marie Chantel
Agatha Christie's Poirot (1989) – Mrs. Vanderlyn
Perfect Scoundrels (1990) – Eva Sanderson
The Orchid House (1991) – Mamselle the Tutor
Boon (1991) – Ann Fielding
Bugs (1995) – Irene Campbell
Kavanagh QC (1996) – Marcia Jacobs
Absolutely Fabulous (1996) – Kalishia Klegg Ferruzzi
Highlander (1997) – Anna Hidalgo
A Dance to the Music of Time (1997) – Miss Weedon
Heartbeat (1998) – Dorothea Cliveden
Midsomer Murders (2002) –  Rosalind Parr
Ultimate Force (2002) – Mrs. Leonard
Doctors (2003–2006) – Linda Larchmont / Stella Dale
The Line of Beauty (2006) – Elena
The Worst Week of My Life (2006) – Daphne
Hughie Green, Most Sincerely (2008) – Christina Sharples

Stage
The Comedy of Errors, The Courtesan, Royal Shakespeare Company, Aldwych Theatre London, The Courtesan
Troilus and Cressida, Royal Shakespeare Company, Aldwych Theatre London, Cassandra
The Way of the World, Royal Shakespeare Company, Aldwych Theatre London, Mrs Fainall
Love's Labour's Lost, Royal Shakespeare Company, Stratford/Aldwych Theatre London, The Princess of France
Pillars of the Community, Royal Shakespeare Company, Aldwych Theatre London, Mrs Lynge
A Midsummer Night's Dream, Royal Shakespeare Company, Stratford/Aldwych Theatre London, Hippolyta
Captain Swing, Royal Shakespeare Company, Stratford/Warehouse Theatre London, Lady Cummings
Piaf, Royal Shakespeare Company, Stratford, Madeleine
Children of the Sun, Royal Shakespeare Company, Aldwych Theatre London, Eliena
Once in a Lifetime, Royal Shakespeare Company, Stratford/Aldwych Theatre London/Piccadilly Theatre London, Miss Leighton
Macbeth, Old Vic Tour, USA, Lady Macbeth
Antony and Cleopatra, Mermaid Theatre London, Cleopatra
Desire Under the Elms, Greenwich Theatre London, Abbie
Candy Kisses, Bush Theatre London, Bobby
Peace in Our Time, UK Tour, Lyia Vivian
Facade, London Symphony Orchestra, Wind Harmonie, Queen Elizabeth Hall London, Narrator
Hay Fever, Albery Theatre London, Myra
Salome, Royal National Theatre London/Phoenix Theatre London/BAM Theatre New York/World Tour, Herodias
Mind Millie For Me, Haymarket Theatre London, Countess Irene
The Importance of Being Earnest, Ambassador Theatre Group National Tour UK,  Gwendoline/Maria

Awards and nominations
 Won the London Theatre Critics' Award 1979 for Best Supporting Actress for her performance in Once in a Lifetime
 Nominated for the Laurence Olivier Theatre Award 1979 for Best Supporting Actress for her performance in Once in a Lifetime

References

External links
 
 

1950 births
Living people
English film actresses
English television actresses
English stage actresses
Actresses from London
20th-century English actresses
21st-century English actresses